EKD is the Evangelical Church in Germany.

EKD may refer to:

 Basque Christian Democracy, a defunct political party
 Warsaw Commuter Railway